This page indexes the individual year in Finnish music pages. Each year is annotated with a significant event as a reference point.


2010s - Pre-2010s

2010s
 2019 in Finnish music
 2018 in Finnish music
 2017 in Finnish music
 2016 in Finnish music
 2015 in Finnish music
 2014 in Finnish music
 2013 in Finnish music
 2012 in Finnish music
 2011 in Finnish music
 2010 in Finnish music

Pre-2010s
 2009 in Finnish music

 Finland
Finland years
Finnish music-related lists